Monique Sullivan (born 21 February 1989) is a Canadian cyclist. She was born in Calgary, Alberta. She competed in keirin at the 2012 Summer Olympics in London, where she placed sixth. She also competed in women's sprint and placed 11th.

Career 
She won a bronze medal at the 2007 Track Cycling World Junior Championships in the Keirin event.

In 2009, she had top-10 finishes at World Cup event in Beijing (sprint) and Manchester (keirin). She won the National Championship in the sprint event in 2010 and won bronze in the 500m. That year, she'd also capture silver at the Pan American Championships in Mexico City, Mexico and finished in fourth place in the 500m and sprint events. In 2011, Sullivan had top-10 finishes in the sprint and keirin events at the World Cup in Cali, Colombia.

In 2012, Sullivan captured double gold at the Pan American Championships in Mar del Plata, Argentina. She finished first in the women's keirin and the women's sprint. She also competed at the 2010 Commonwealth Games in Delhi, India and captured bronze in the team sprint event with Tara Whitten.

At the 2015 UCI Track Cycling World Championships, she finished 4th in the keirin event, 12th in the team sprint event, and 15th at the individual pursuit.

In 2016, she was officially named to Canada's 2016 Olympic team. In Rio, Kate O'Brien and Sullivan were eliminated in the repechage of the women's keirin. Sullivan couldn't recover in her heat race after she was boxed in, with Lyubov Shulika of the Ukraine racing by her while one of the two Spanish riders came over the top, and the Canadian faded down the stretch. Overall, her results in Rio included: 8th in team sprint, 17th in individual sprint and 25th in Keirin.

Career results

2014
Pan American Track Championships
1st  Keirin
2nd  Sprint
Grand Prix of Colorado Spring 
1st Sprint
3rd Keirin
Copa Internacional de Pista
1st Keirin
1st Sprint
3rd 500m Time Trial
Los Angeles Grand Prix
1st Sprint
2nd Keirin
3rd Keirin, Festival of Speed
2015
Pan American Track Championships
1st  Keirin
1st  Sprint
3rd  Team Sprint (with Kate O'Brien)
Pan American Games
1st  Keirin
1st  Sprint
1st  Team Sprint (with Kate O'Brien)
Milton International Challenge
1st Sprint
1st Team Sprint (with Kate O'Brien)
2nd Keirin
1st Keirin, Fastest Man on Wheels
Festival of Speed
1st Keirin
3rd Sprint
3rd Sprint, US Sprint GP
2016
Festival of Speed 
1st Keirin
1st Sprint
1st Sprint, US Sprint GP

References

External links
 
 https://moniquesullivan.wordpress.com/

1989 births
Living people
Canadian female cyclists
Cyclists at the 2012 Summer Olympics
Cyclists at the 2016 Summer Olympics
Olympic cyclists of Canada
Sportspeople from Calgary
Cyclists at the 2010 Commonwealth Games
Cyclists at the 2014 Commonwealth Games
Cyclists at the 2015 Pan American Games
Commonwealth Games bronze medallists for Canada
Pan American Games gold medalists for Canada
Commonwealth Games medallists in cycling
Pan American Games medalists in cycling
Medalists at the 2015 Pan American Games
Medallists at the 2010 Commonwealth Games